Iain Banks (16 February 1954 – 9 June 2013) was a British author, writing mainstream fiction as Iain Banks and science fiction as Iain M. Banks, adding the initial of his adopted middle name Menzies. After the success of The Wasp Factory (1984), he began to write full time. His first science fiction book, Consider Phlebas, appeared in 1987, marking the start of the Culture series. His books have been adapted for theatre, radio, and television. In 2008, The Times named Banks in their list of "The 50 greatest British writers since 1945".

In April 2013, Banks announced he had inoperable cancer and was unlikely to live beyond a year. He died on 9 June 2013.

Early life
Banks was born in Dunfermline, Fife, to a mother who was a professional ice skater and a father who was an officer in the Admiralty. An only child, he lived in North Queensferry until the age of nine, near the naval dockyards in Rosyth, where his father was based. The family then moved to Gourock due to his father's work. When someone introduced him to science fiction by giving him Kemlo and the Zones of Silence by Reginald Alec Martin, he continued reading the series, which encouraged him to write science fiction himself. After attending Gourock and Greenock High Schools, Banks studied English, philosophy, and psychology at the University of Stirling (1972–1975).

After graduation, Banks took a succession of jobs that left him free to write in the evenings. These supported his writing throughout his twenties and allowed him to take long breaks between contracts, during which time he travelled through Europe and North America. During this period he worked as an IBM 'Expediter Analyser' (a kind of procurement clerk), a testing technician for the British Steel Corporation, and a costing clerk for a law firm in London's Chancery Lane.

Career

Writing career
Banks took up writing at the age of 11. He completed a first novel, The Hungarian Lift-Jet, at 16 and a second, TTR (also entitled The Tashkent Rambler) in his first year at Stirling University in 1972. Though he saw himself mainly as a science fiction author, his publishing problems led him to pursue mainstream fiction. His first published novel The Wasp Factory, appeared in 1984, when he was thirty. After the success of The Wasp Factory, Banks began to write full time. His editor at Macmillan, James Hale, advised him to write a book a year, which he agreed to do.

His second novel Walking on Glass followed in 1985, then The Bridge in 1986, and in 1987 Espedair Street, which was later broadcast as a series on BBC Radio 4. His first published science fiction book, Consider Phlebas, emerged in 1987 and as the first of several in the acclaimed Culture series. Banks cited Robert A. Heinlein, Isaac Asimov, Arthur C. Clarke, Brian Aldiss, M. John Harrison and Dan Simmons as influences. The Crow Road, published in 1992, was adapted as a BBC television series. Banks continued to write both science fiction and mainstream. His final novel The Quarry appeared in June 2013, the month of his death.

Banks published work under two names. His parents had meant to name him "Iain Menzies Banks", but his father mistakenly registered him as "Iain Banks". Banks still used the middle name and submitted The Wasp Factory for publication as "Iain M. Banks". Banks's editor inquired about the possibility of omitting the 'M' as it appeared "too fussy" and the potential existed for confusion with Rosie M. Banks, a romantic novelist in the Jeeves novels by P. G. Wodehouse; Banks agreed to the omission. After three mainstream novels, Banks's publishers agreed to publish his first science fiction (SF) novel Consider Phlebas. To create a distinction between the mainstream and the SF, Banks suggested returning the 'M' to his name, which was then used in all of his science fiction works.

By his death in June 2013, Banks had published 26 novels. A 27th novel The Quarry was published posthumously. His final work, a poetry collection, appeared in February 2015. In an interview in January 2013, he also mentioned he had the plot idea for another novel in the Culture series, which would most likely have been his next book and was planned for publication in 2014.

Banks wrote in various categories, but enjoyed science fiction most.

In September 2012 Banks became a Guest of Honour at the 2014 World Science Fiction Convention, Loncon 3.

Radio and television
Banks was the subject of The Strange Worlds of Iain Banks South Bank Show (1997), a TV documentary that examined his mainstream writing, and was an in-studio guest for the final episode of Marc Riley's Rocket Science radio show, broadcast on BBC Radio 6 Music. An audio version of The Business, set to contemporary music, arranged by Paul Oakenfold, was broadcast in October 1999 on Galaxy Fm as the tenth Urban Soundtracks.
Banks's The State of the Art, adapted for radio by Paul Cornell, was broadcast on BBC Radio 4 in 2009 with Nadia Molinari producing and directing. In 1998 Espedair Street was dramatised as a serial for Radio 4, presented by Paul Gambaccini in the style of a Radio 1 documentary.

In 2011 Banks featured on the BBC Radio 4 programme Saturday Live. Banks reaffirmed his atheism in this appearance, explaining death as an important "part of the totality of life" that should be treated realistically instead of feared.

Banks appeared on the BBC television programme Question Time, a show that features political discussion. In 2006 he captained a team of writers to victory in a special series of BBC Two's University Challenge. Banks also won a 2006 edition of BBC One's Celebrity Mastermind; the author selected "Malt whisky and the distilleries of Scotland" as his specialist subject.

His final interview was with Kirsty Wark, broadcast on BBC2 Scotland as Iain Banks: Raw Spirit 12 June 2013.

BBC One Scotland and BBC2 broadcast an adaptation of his novel Stonemouth in June 2015.

Theatre
Banks was involved in the stage production The Curse of Iain Banks, written by Maxton Walker and performed at the Edinburgh Fringe festival in 1999. Banks collaborated frequently with its soundtrack composer Gary Lloyd, for instance on a song collection they co-composed as a tribute to the fictional band Frozen Gold from Banks's novel Espedair Street. Lloyd also scored for a spoken word and music production of his novel The Bridge, which Banks himself voiced and which featured a cast of 40 musicians, released on CD by Codex Records in 1996. Lloyd recorded Banks for including in the play as a disembodied voice of himself in one of the cast member's dreams. Lloyd explained his collaboration with Banks on their first versions of Espedair Street (later versions being dated between 2005 and 2013) in a Guardian article prior to the opening of The Curse of Iain Banks:
When he [Banks] first played them to me, I think he was worried that they might not be up to scratch (some of them dated back to 1973 and had never been heard). He needn't have worried. They're fantastic. We're slaving away to get the songs to the stage where we can go into the studio and make a demo. Iain bashes out melodies on his state-of-the-art Apple Mac in Edinburgh and sends them down to me in Chester where I put them onto my Atari.

Politics
Banks' political stance has been termed "left of centre" and in 2002 endorsed the Scottish Socialist Party.

He was an Honorary Associate of the National Secular Society and a Distinguished Supporter of the Humanist Society Scotland. As a signatory to the Declaration of Calton Hill, he supported Scottish independence. In November 2012, Banks backed the campaign group emerging from the Radical Independence Conference held in that month. He opined that the independence movement was marked by cooperation: "Scots just seem to be more communitarian than the consensus expressed by the UK population as a whole."

In late 2004, Banks joined a group of UK politicians and media figures campaigning to have Prime Minister Tony Blair impeached after the 2003 invasion of Iraq. In protest, he cut up his passport and posted it to 10 Downing Street. In a Socialist Review interview, Banks explained that his passport protest occurred after he had "abandoned the idea of crashing my Land Rover through the gates of Fife dockyard, after spotting the guys armed with machine guns." Banks relayed his concerns about the Iraq invasion in his book Raw Spirit and through the protagonist Alban McGill in the novel The Steep Approach to Garbadale, who confronts another character with arguments of a similar kind.

In 2010, Banks called for a cultural and educational boycott of Israel after the Gaza flotilla raid incident. In a letter to The Guardian newspaper, Banks said he had instructed his agent to turn down any further book translation deals with Israeli publishers:
Appeals to reason, international law, U. N. resolutions and simple human decency mean – it is now obvious – nothing to Israel... I would urge all writers, artists and others in the creative arts, as well as those academics engaging in joint educational projects with Israeli institutions, to consider doing everything they can to convince Israel of its moral degradation and ethical isolation, preferably by simply having nothing more to do with this outlaw state.

An extract from Banks's contribution to the written collection Generation Palestine: Voices from the Boycott, Divestment and Sanctions Movement, entitled "Our People", appeared in The Guardian in the wake of the author's cancer revelation. The extract conveys the author's support for the Boycott, Divestment and Sanctions (BDS) campaign issued by a Palestinian civil society against Israel until the country complies with what it holds are international law and Palestinian rights. This commenced in 2005 and applies lessons from Banks's experience with South Africa's apartheid era. The continuation of Banks's boycott of Israeli publishers for the sale of rights to his novels was confirmed in the extract and Banks further explained, "I don't buy Israeli-sourced products or food, and my partner and I try to support Palestinian-sourced products wherever possible."

Personal life
Banks met his first wife Annie in London before the 1984 release of his first book. They lived in Faversham in the south of England, then split up in 1988. Banks returned to Edinburgh and dated another woman for two years. Iain and Annie were reconciled a year later and they moved to Fife. They were married in Hawaii in 1992, but in 2007, after 15 years of marriage, they announced their separation.

In 1998 Banks was in a near-fatal accident when his car rolled off the road. In February 2007, Banks sold his extensive car collection, including a 3.2-litre Porsche Boxster, a Porsche 911 Turbo, a 3.8-litre Jaguar Mark II, a 5-litre BMW M5 and a daily-use diesel Land Rover Defender, whose power he had boosted by about 50 per cent. All these Banks exchanged for a Lexus RX 400h hybrid – later replaced by a diesel Toyota Yaris, and said in future he would fly only in emergencies.

In April 2012 Banks became the "Acting Honorary Non-Executive Figurehead President Elect pro tem (trainee)" of the Science Fiction Book Club based in London. The title was his creation and on 3 October 2012 Banks accepted a T-shirt inscribed with it.

From 2007 Banks lived in North Queensferry on the north side of the Firth of Forth, with his girlfriend Adele Hartley, an author and founder of the Dead by Dawn film festival. She and Banks had been friends since the early 1990s, but commenced romantic relations in 2006 and married on 29 March 2013 after he asked her to "do me the honour of becoming my widow."

Illness and death
On 3 April 2013, Banks announced on his website and on one set up by him and some friends that he had been diagnosed with terminal gallbladder cancer and was unlikely to live beyond a year. He stated he would be withdrawing from all public engagements and that The Quarry would be his last novel. The dates of publication of The Quarry were brought forward at Banks's request, to 20 June 2013 in the UK and 25 June 2013 in the US and Canada. He died on 9 June 2013.

Remembrance and tribute
Banks's publisher called him "an irreplaceable part of the literary world". This was reaffirmed by a fellow Scottish author and friend since secondary school Ken MacLeod: his death "left a large gap in the Scottish literary scene as well as the wider English-speaking world." British author Charles Stross wrote, "One of the giants of 20th and 21st century Scottish literature has left the building." Authors, including Neil Gaiman, Ian Rankin, Alastair Reynolds and David Brin also paid tribute in blogs and elsewhere.

The asteroid 5099 Iainbanks was named after him shortly after his death. On 23 January 2015, SpaceX's CEO Elon Musk named two of the firm's autonomous spaceport drone ships Just Read The Instructions and Of Course I Still Love You, after ships in Banks's novel The Player of Games. Another, A Shortfall of Gravitas, began construction in 2018. This refers to the ship Experiencing A Significant Gravitas Shortfall, first mentioned in Look to Windward.

The Red Virgin and the Vision of Utopia, the 2016 graphic biography of Louise Michel by Mary M. Talbot and Bryan Talbot, is "Dedicated to the memory of Iain (M) Banks, friend and sorely missed creator of socialist utopias."

Empire Games, the seventh book in The Merchant Princes series by Charles Stross published in 2017, is dedicated "For Iain M. Banks, who painted a picture of a better way."

On 13 May 2019, the Five Deeps Expedition broke the deepest ocean dive record in the DSV Limiting Factor. The support ship was named DSSV Pressure Drop. Both vessels were named after ships in the Culture series, which is much admired by the explorer Victor Vescovo, also the financial sponsor behind Limiting Factors design and construction.

Awards and nominations
Iain Banks received the following literary awards and nominations:

Bibliography

Non-SF works 
Banks's non-SF work comprises fourteen novels and one non-fiction book. Many of his novels contain elements of autobiography, and feature various locations in his native Scotland. Raw Spirit (subtitled In Search of the Perfect Dram) is a travel book of Banks's visits to the distilleries of Scotland in search of the finest whisky, including his musings on other subjects such as cars and politics.

Fiction
The Wasp Factory (1984). London: Macmillan. 
Walking on Glass (1985). London: Macmillan. 
The Bridge (1986). London: Macmillan. 
Espedair Street (1987). London: Macmillan. . Adapted for BBC radio in 1998 (directed by Dave Batchelor).
Canal Dreams (1989). London: Macmillan.   
The Crow Road (1992). London: Scribners. . Adapted for BBC TV in 1996 (directed by Gavin Millar).
Complicity (1993). London: Little, Brown Book Group. . Filmed in 2000 (directed by Gavin Millar); retitled Retribution for its US DVD/video release.
Whit (1995). London: Little, Brown Book Group.  
A Song of Stone (1997). London: Abacus. 
The Business (1999). London: Little, Brown Book Group. .
Dead Air (2002). London: Little, Brown Book Group.  
The Steep Approach to Garbadale (2007). London: Little, Brown Book Group. 
Stonemouth (2012). London: Little, Brown Book Group. . Adapted for BBC TV for broadcast in 2015 (directed by Charles Martin.)
The Quarry (2013). London: Little, Brown Book Group.

Non-fiction
Raw Spirit (2003). London: Century.  – a travelogue of Scotland and its whisky distilleries.
Poems (with Ken MacLeod) (2015). London: Little, Brown Group.

Science fiction
Banks wrote thirteen SF novels, nine of which were part of the Culture series, and a short story collection called The State of the Art (1991), which includes some stories set in the same universe. These works focus upon characters that are usually on the margins of the Culture, a post-scarcity anarchist utopia. In the same universe are other civilizations, which the Culture sometimes attempts to influence or "contact", occasionally resulting in conflict. The culture has achieved utopia by handing control of all of their worlds and ships over to sentient artificial intelligences referred to as "Minds".

The Culture novels
Consider Phlebas (1987). London: Macmillan. 
The Player of Games (1988). London: Macmillan. 
Use of Weapons (1990). London: Orbit. 
The State of the Art (1991). London: Orbit.  – also included below in short fiction collections, but included here because it is considered part of the culture series.
Excession (1996). London: Orbit. 
Inversions (1998). London: Orbit. 
Look to Windward (2000). London: Orbit. 
Matter (2008). London: Orbit. 
Surface Detail (2010). London: Orbit. 
The Hydrogen Sonata (2012). London: Orbit.

Other novels
Against a Dark Background (1993). London: Orbit. 
Feersum Endjinn (1994). London: Orbit. 
The Algebraist (2004). London: Orbit. 
Transition (2009). London: Little, Brown Book Group. . (Published in the United States as Iain M. Banks.)

Short fiction collections
The State of the Art (1991). London: Orbit. 
Includes three short works set in the Culture universe. It also includes works of fiction more characteristic of Banks's writing published as Iain Banks. A radio version of the title story was transmitted by Radio 4 in 2009.
The Spheres (Birmingham Science Fiction Group, 2010)
Includes 'The Spheres', excised from the original draft of Transition; and 'The Secret Courtyard', excised from Matter. Limited edition of 500, to mark Novacon 40.

Introductions
Banks wrote introductions for works by other writers including:
Viriconium (1988) by M. John Harrison, the Unwin edition, .
The Adventures of Luther Arkwright: Book 3, Götterdämmerung (1989) by Bryan Talbot from Proutt Publishing, .
The Orbit Science Fiction Yearbook Three (1990) edited by David S. Garnett, .

References

Further reading

Simone Caroti: The Culture Series of Iain M. Banks: A Critical Introduction, McFarland, April 2015, 
Nick Hubble, Esther MacCallum-Stewart and Joseph Norman (eds.):The Science Fiction of Iain M. Banks, Gylphi Limited, January 2018, 
Paul Kincaid: Iain M. Banks, University of Illinois Press, May 2017, 
The Science Fiction Foundation have published an analysis of Ken MacLeod's work titled The True Knowledge Of Ken MacLeod  (2003), edited by Andrew M. Butler and Farah Mendlesohn. As well as critical essays and material on MacLeod, it includes MacLeod's introduction to the German edition of Banks' Consider Phlebas and essays comparing the works of the two authors.

External links

AZAD the Game the Boardgame development website

1954 births
2013 deaths
20th-century atheists
20th-century British male writers
20th-century British writers
20th-century British non-fiction writers
20th-century British novelists
20th-century British short story writers
20th-century Scottish male writers
20th-century Scottish novelists
21st-century atheists
21st-century British male writers
21st-century British non-fiction writers
21st-century British novelists
21st-century British poets
21st-century British short story writers
21st-century Scottish male writers
21st-century Scottish novelists
21st-century Scottish poets
21st-century travel writers
Alumni of the University of Stirling
British atheists
British crime writers
British horror writers
British humanists
British male non-fiction writers
British male novelists
British male poets
British male short story writers
British mystery writers
British secularists
British science fiction writers
British social commentators
British speculative fiction writers
British thriller writers
British travel writers
Constructed language creators
Critics of religions
Deaths from cancer in Scotland
Deaths from gallbladder cancer
Freethought writers
Military science fiction writers
People from Dunfermline
British psychological fiction writers
Scottish atheists
Scottish crime writers
Scottish horror writers
Scottish humanists
Scottish male novelists
Scottish male poets
Scottish mystery writers
Scottish non-fiction writers
Scottish science fiction writers
Scottish short story writers
Scottish social commentators
Scottish speculative fiction writers
Scottish thriller writers
Scottish travel writers
Secular humanists
Surrealist poets
Surrealist writers
Techno-thriller writers
Weird fiction writers
Writers about activism and social change
Writers about globalization
Writers about religion and science
Writers of Gothic fiction
Writers of historical fiction set in the modern age
Authors of utopian literature